Luys may refer to:

People
 Guillemette du Luys
 Jules Bernard Luys (1828–1897), French neurologist
 Luys Ycart
 Luys d'Averçó (1350–1412), Catalan politician, naval financier, and man of letters

Other
 Luys Alliance
 Luys foundation

See also
 Luis